The Evelina M. Goulart is an 83-foot (25.2-meter) fishing schooner built by Arthur D. Story in the Story Shipyard (now the Essex Historical Society and Shipbuilding Museum) in 1927. She is one of seven surviving Essex-built fishing schooners and the only one to be virtually unchanged from its original configuration. At some point in her life she was converted into a fishing dragger, being fitted with an engine for the purpose.

Throughout her life she was primarily used for swordfishing. In 1985 Hurricane Gloria touched down in the New England area and damaged the stern of the Goulart. Tied up to the wharf and retired, her engine was removed. At some point the bilge pumps failed and the vessel sank.

In 1990 Evelina M. Goulart was donated to the Essex Shipbuilding Museum. Housed in an open-sided shed, the ship was intended as an example of ship construction, once the ship was stabilized. However the hull is badly deteriorated and the vessel may end its days at the breakers, with only the significant portions preserved for the future.

See also
 List of schooners

References
Essex Shipbuilding Museum
Related NYT article
Saving The Evelina M. Goulart

External links

Schooners of the United States
Ships built in Essex, Massachusetts
Historic American Engineering Record in Massachusetts
Individual sailing vessels
Tall ships of the United States
Museum ships in Massachusetts
Ships preserved in museums
1927 ships